The Best American Short Stories 2002, a volume in The Best American Short Stories series, was edited by Katrina Kenison and by guest editor Sue Miller.

Short stories included

Other notable stories

Among the other notable writers whose stories were among the "100 Other Distinguished Stories of 2001" were Ann Beattie, Dan Chaon, Stuart Dybek, Louise Erdrich, Joyce Carol Oates, Bob Shacochis, John Updike and the late Richard Yates.

Notes

2002 anthologies
Fiction anthologies
Short Stories 2002
Houghton Mifflin books